Karrie Ann Webb  (born 21 December 1974) is an Australian professional golfer. She plays mainly on the U.S.-based LPGA Tour, and also turns out once or twice a year on the ALPG Tour in her home country. She is a member of the World Golf Hall of Fame. She has 41 wins on the LPGA Tour, more than any other active player.

Early life and amateur career 

Webb was born in Ayr, Queensland. She was a member of the Australian Amateur team, making six international appearances from 1992 to 1994, including a 1994 appearance in the Espirito Santo Trophy World Amateur Golf Team Championships. This was the year she became the Australian Stroke Play Champion

Professional career
Webb began her professional golfing career in 1994 playing on the Ladies European Tour, where she finished second at the Women's Australian Open, and the Futures Tour in the U.S., where she won one tournament. In 1995 she became the youngest ever winner of the Weetabix Women's British Open in her rookie season in Europe, prior to it being classed as an LPGA major, and was European Rookie of the Year. She qualified for the LPGA Tour after she finished second at the LPGA Final Qualifying Tournament, despite playing with a broken bone in her wrist.

In 1996 Webb won her first LPGA tournament in her second LPGA start at the HealthSouth Inaugural, on the fourth hole of a sudden death
playoff. She won three other tournaments and became the first LPGA player to win $1 million mark in a single season, topping the year end money list. She was also the 1996 LPGA Rookie of the Year.

In 1997 Webb won three times on the LPGA Tour including another win at the Weetabix Women's British Open, won her first Vare Trophy and was voted 1997 ESPY Best Female Golfer. In 1999 Webb won her first major championship at the du Maurier Ltd. Classic and won her first LPGA Tour Player of the Year award.

Webb also took part in the largest playoff in LPGA Tour history at the 1999 Jamie Farr Kroger Classic. Se Ri Pak birdied the first sudden death playoff hole to defeat Webb, Mardi Lunn, Carin Koch, Sherri Steinhauer, and Kelli Kuehne.

In 2000, Webb won two more major championships, following up her win at the Nabisco Championship with a win at the U.S. Women's Open. This gained her a second consecutive Rolex Player of the Year title and Vare Trophy, and she topped the money list, missing out on a chance to become the LPGA's first single-season $2 million winner by taking a mid season break to return home to Australia to run with the Olympic torch. Teamed with Rachel Hetherington representing Australia she won the Women's World Cup in Malaysia, was awarded the preeminent sport award in Australia, the Dawn Fraser Award. and was named Female Player of the Year by the Golf Writers Association of America.

She successfully defended her U.S. Women's Open title in 2001 and won the LPGA Championship, to become the youngest winner of the LPGA Career Grand Slam. She teamed with David Duval to play against Annika Sörenstam and Tiger Woods in a made-for-TV Battle at Bighorn between the two best male and two best female players in the world. At the time, it provided women's golf its largest audience ever. Webb's win at the 2002 Women's British Open, which had become an LPGA major in 2001, meant she completed a Super Career Grand Slam – every available major championship in women's golf in her career.

Webb then suffered a three-year slump. She collected just two LPGA wins in the next two years, and in 2005 had a best LPGA finish of tied sixth although she did team up with Rachel Hetherington to represent Australia at the Women's World Cup of Golf and won her fifth ANZ Ladies Masters title back home in Australia.

Webb qualified for entry to the World Golf Hall of Fame in 2000, but was not eligible for induction until she had played ten LPGA Tour events in each of ten seasons. She met this criterion on 9 June 2005 when she completed the first round of the LPGA Championship. At age 30, she became the youngest living person ever to enter the Hall of Fame, and kept that distinction until 2007, when fellow LPGA star Se Ri Pak was inducted.

Webb staged a comeback season in 2006. In the final round at the Kraft Nabisco Championship she holed a 116-yard shot from the fairway to eagle the 18th hole, and then birdied the same hole in a sudden-death playoff to beat Lorena Ochoa and win her second Kraft Nabisco Championship. She won four other tournaments including the Evian Masters and Mizuno Classic. Her 2006 Kraft Nabisco win took her into the top ten of the Women's World Golf Rankings for the first time since they were introduced in February 2006.

Her 41 LPGA Tour victories places her tied for 10th with Babe Zaharias on the list of players with the most career LPGA tournament wins and first among all active players.

Professional wins (56)

LPGA Tour wins (41)

LPGA Tour playoff record (4–6)

LPGA majors are shown in bold.

ALPG Tour wins (13)
1998 (1) Australian Ladies Masters2
1999 (1) Australian Ladies Masters2
2000 (2) AAMI Women's Australian Open4, Australian Ladies Masters2
2001 (1) ANZ Ladies Masters4
2002 (1) AAMI Women's Australian Open4
2005 (1) ANZ Ladies Masters4
2007 (2) MFS Women's Australian Open4, ANZ Ladies Masters4
2008 (1) MFS Women's Australian Open4
2010 (1) ANZ Ladies Masters4
2013 (1) Volvik RACV Ladies Masters4
2014 (1) ISPS Handa Women's Australian Open5

LPGA of Japan Tour wins (3)
2000 (1) Nichriei World Ladies Cup
2001 (1) Nichriei World Ladies Cup
2006 (1) Mizuno Classic3

Ladies European Tour wins (15)
1995 (1) Weetabix Women's British Open1
1997 (1) Weetabix Women's British Open1
2000 (1) AAMI Women's Australian Open4
2001 (1) ANZ Ladies Masters4
2002 (2) AAMI Women's Australian Open4, Weetabix Women's British Open1
2005 (1) ANZ Ladies Masters4
2006 (1) Evian Masters1
2007 (2) MFS Women's Australian Open4, ANZ Ladies Masters4
2008 (1) MFS Women's Australian Open4
2010 (1) ANZ Ladies Masters4
2013 (2) Volvik RACV Ladies Masters4, ISPS Handa Ladies European Masters
2014 (1) ISPS Handa Women's Australian Open5
Note: Webb won The Evian Championship (formerly named the Evian Masters) once before it was recognized as a major championship on the LPGA Tour in 2013,  but after it was co-sanctioned by the LPGA Tour in 2000. Webb won the Women's British Open twice before it was recognized as a major championship on the LPGA Tour in 2001, but after it was co-sanctioned by the LPGA Tour in 1994 and once after it was recognized as a major championship in 2001.

Futures Tour wins (1)
1995 Golden Flake Golden Ocala Futures Classic

Other wins (2)
2000 Women's World Cup Golf (with Rachel Hetherington)
2003 ConAgra LPGA Skins Game

Notes
1 Co-sanctioned by LPGA Tour and Ladies European Tour
2 Co-sanctioned by LPGA Tour and ALPG Tour
3 Co-sanctioned by LPGA Tour and LPGA of Japan Tour
4 Co-sanctioned by ALPG Tour and Ladies European Tour
5 Co-sanctioned by ALPG Tour, Ladies European Tour, and LPGA Tour

Major championships

Wins (7)

1 Defeated Ochoa with birdie on first extra hole

Results timeline
Results not in chronological order before 2019.

^ The Women's British Open replaced the du Maurier Classic as an LPGA major in 2001.
^^ The Evian Championship was added as a major in 2013 
† Webb won the Women's British Open in 1995 and 1997 before it became an LPGA major.

CUT = missed the half-way cut
"T" = tied for place

Summary

Most consecutive cuts made – 23 (2007 British Open – 2013 U.S. Open)
Longest streak of top-10s – 9 (1999 U.S. Open – 2001 U.S. Open)

LPGA Tour career summary

 official through 2022 season
* Includes matchplay and other tournaments without a cut

World ranking
Position in Women's World Golf Rankings at the end of each calendar year.

Honours
Webb was awarded the Centenary Medal on 1 January 2001.

On 26 January 2010 Webb was appointed a Member of the Order of Australia for service to golf, and to the community as a benefactor and supporter of a range of health and disability organisations.

In January 2018 Webb was made an Officer of the Order of Australia (AO) for distinguished service to golf at the elite level as a player, to the development of female golfers, as a mentor and role model, and through charitable and community organisations".

In 2022, she was inducted into Sport Australia Hall of Fame.

Team appearances
Amateur
Espirito Santo Trophy (representing Australia): 1994
Tasman Cup (representing Australia): 1993 (winners)
Queen Sirikit Cup (representing Australia): 1992, 1993, 1994
Gladys Hay Memorial Cup (representing Queensland): 1991, 1992, 1993

Professional
World Cup (representing Australia): 2005
International Crown (representing Australia): 2014, 2016
The Queens (representing Australia): 2017 (captain)

See also

List of female golfers
List of golfers with most LPGA Tour wins
List of golfers with most LPGA major championship wins
Monday Night Golf
Women's Career Grand Slam Champion

References

External links

Karrie Webb at the Golf Australia official site

Australian female golfers
ALPG Tour golfers
LPGA Tour golfers
Winners of LPGA major golf championships
World Golf Hall of Fame inductees
Sport Australia Hall of Fame inductees
Members of the Order of Australia
Officers of the Order of Australia
Recipients of the Centenary Medal
Recipients of the Australian Sports Medal
People from Queensland
Sportspeople from Boynton Beach, Florida
1974 births
Living people